Bennet Skheto Baloyi (born 11 January 1978) known by his stage name Benny Mayengani is a South African Xitsonga singer. He rose to fame following the release  of his debut studio album Tiba Ben in 2011.

Music career
Benny Mayengani is known for his collaboration with Mr Jambatani, Prince Ranghani, Joe Shirimani na Vana va Ndoda under Limpopo Poison. He released his debut studio album Tiba Ben in 2011 which gained him prominent notability in the Xitsonga music industry. On 28 September 2013 during Xitsonga Music Awards, Benny Mayengani scored three nominations in these categories; Best Xitsonga Male Artist, Best Xitsonga Popular Song of the year and Best Xitsonga Album of the year.

His 10th studio album Ni Happy which was released in 2019 was nominated at the Limpopo Music Awards for Best Male Artist.
Benny Mayengani recently released an album "Malambani" on the 27th of November 2020 which topped the iTunes Charts for four days in a row, in fact one can say that malambani did good on online platforms.

Politics
Benny Mayingani apart from his musical career he became the first Tsonga musician to be an official of the Johannesburg Chamber as PR Councilor of City of Johannesburg accounted by Economic Freedom Fighters in 2016. On 7 October 2019 Benny Mayengani quit as the PR Councilor of EFF. In February 2020 Limpopo Chairperson Stanley Mathabatha of African National Congress , officially welcomed Benny Mayengani to the ANC.

Lawsuits and civil disputes

"Fill Up" trademark 
Benny Mayengani was looking forward to host music concert, #FillUpGiyaniStadium in 2018. He used a similar affix ("Fill Up"/"#FillUp") as South African rapper Cassper Nyovest, which resulted in accusation made by Cassper Nyovest that Benny Mayengani used his trademark by sending Benny Mayengani a cease and desist letter. Investigation revealed that Cassper Nyovest did not own the #FillUp trademark and can not take any action against Benny Mayengani.

Discography
 Tiba Ben – 2011
 President Mayengani – 2012
 Ntombhi yaku xonga – 2013
 December Revolution – 2014
 Nkondo wa Tuva – 2015
 Vayuda – 2014
 Nkelunkelu – 2015
 Vitanani Fire Brigade – 2016
 Tintoma – 2018
 Ni Happy – 2019
 Volume – 2019
 Malambani - 2020
 Tiko Raka Hina - 2021
 Jeso - 2022
 Vamatiko - 2022

Awards and nominations

Xitsonga Music Awards

|-
|rowspan="1" | XMA10 2012
|Benny Mayengani
|Best Xitsonga Polpular Song of the year
|rowspan="1" 
|-
|rowspan="5" | XMA13 2015
|Nghoma (w/ Limpopo Roots)
|Best Xitsonga House Song 
|rowspan="2" 
|-
|Benny Mayengani
|Best Xitsonga Duo/Group
|-
|Kecekece (w/ Kenny Bevhula,  Percy Mfana, Prince Rhangane  & Sunglen)
|Best Xitsonga Collaboration
|rowspan="1" 
|-
|Benny Mayengani
|Best Male Artist
|rowspan="2" 
|-
|Nkondo wa tuva
|Most Popular Song
|}

Limpopo Music Awards

|-
|rowspan="2" | LIMA 2019
|Benny Mayegani
|INDUSTRY CONTRIBUTOR “FILL UP GIYANI STADIUM” 
|rowspan="1"
|-
|Himself
|Best Male Artist
|rowspan="1"
|}

References

South African musicians
People from Limpopo
Living people
1978 births